760 Massinga (prov. designation:  or ) is a large background asteroid from the outer regions of the asteroid belt, approximately  in diameter. It was discovered by German astronomer Franz Kaiser at the Heidelberg Observatory on 28 August 1913. The stony S-type asteroid has a rotation period of 10.7 hours and is somewhat elongated in shape. It was named in memory of Adam Massinger (1888–1914), a German astronomer at Heidelberg who was killed in World War I.

Orbit and classification 

Massinga is a non-family asteroid of the main belt's background population when applying the hierarchical clustering method to its proper orbital elements. It orbits the Sun in the outer asteroid belt at a distance of 2.4–3.9 AU once every 5 years and 7 months (2,039 days; semi-major axis of 3.15 AU). Its orbit has an eccentricity of 0.23 and an inclination of 13° with respect to the ecliptic.

Discovery 

Massinga was discovered by Franz Kaiser at the Heidelberg-Königstuhl State Observatory in southwest Germany on 28 August 1913. On the same night, it was independently discovered by Russian astronomer Grigory Neujmin at the Simeiz Observatory on the Crimean peninsula. The Minor Planet Center, however, only credits Franz Kaiser with the discovery. The body's observation arc begins at Heidelberg on 8 November 1914, more than a year after its official discovery observation.

Naming 

This minor planet was named after Adam Massinger (1888–1914), a German astronomer and discoverer of minor planets at Heidelberg who died in the First Battle of Ypres during World War I on 21 October 1914. An obituary was published by Max Wolf in the astronomical journal Astronomische Nachrichten. The  was mentioned in The Names of the Minor Planets by Paul Herget in 1955.

Physical characteristics 

In the Tholen classification, Massinga is a common, stony S-type asteroid, though with an unusual spectrum (SU), while in the Tholen- and SMASS-like taxonomic variants of the Small Solar System Objects Spectroscopic Survey (S3OS2), it is an S-type and SL-type, latter which transitions to the uncommon L-type, respectively.

Rotation period 

In December 1999, a rotational lightcurve of Massinga was obtained from photometric observations by Robert A. Koff at his observatory in Colorado. Lightcurve analysis gave a rotation period of  hours with a brightness variation of  magnitude. In March 2006, Laurent Bernasconi and Rui Goncalves determined a similar period of  hours and an amplitude of  magnitude.

Diameter and albedo 

The Collaborative Asteroid Lightcurve Link derives an albedo of 0.2392 and a diameter of 71.47 kilometers based on an absolute magnitude of 7.9.

These timed observations are taken when the asteroid passes in front of a distant star.

References

External links 
 Lightcurve Database Query (LCDB), at www.minorplanet.info
 Dictionary of Minor Planet Names, Google books
 Asteroids and comets rotation curves, CdR – Geneva Observatory, Raoul Behrend
 Discovery Circumstances: Numbered Minor Planets (1)-(5000) – Minor Planet Center
 
 

000760
Discoveries by Franz Kaiser
Named minor planets
000760
19130828